Stephen Francis Barker (January 11, 1927 – December 16, 2019) was an American philosopher of mathematics, a professor emeritus of philosophy at Johns Hopkins University and a faculty member at the University of Southern California, the University of Virginia and Ohio State University.

Barker did his undergraduate studies at Swarthmore College and earned a doctorate from Harvard University in 1954. While at Harvard, he won the Bechtel Prize in 1951 for his essay, "A Study of Phenomenalism". As a young instructor at the University of Southern California, Harvard awarded him the George Santayana Fellowship for the academic year 1954–55. He joined the Johns Hopkins faculty in 1964.

Barker's wife, Evelyn A. Barker, was also a philosopher.

Books
Barker is the author of:
Induction and hypothesis: a study of the logic of confirmation (Cornell University Press, 1957). This study of theories of informal reasoning is structured in four parts: an investigation of the problem of induction, a rejection of explanations based on overriding premises (such as the uniformity of nature) as a form of begging the question, an overview of positivist approaches to the problem, and finally a resolution to the problem based on theories of John George Kemeny involving the selection of the most likely hypothesis to fit a set of observations.
Philosophy of mathematics (Prentice-Hall, 1964). Part of a series of books (edited by Elizabeth and Monroe Beardsley) overviewing the main areas of philosophy, this book describes the main problems in the philosophy of mathematics and evaluates their proposed solutions. Its five chapters concern Euclidean and non-Euclidean geometry, and literalist and non-literalist views on the meaning of numbers.
The elements of logic (McGraw Hill, 1965)
Thomas Reid  critical interpretations (with Tom L. Beauchamp, Philosophical monographs, 1976)

In addition, he edited John Wisdom's Proof and explanation: the Virginia lectures (University Press of America, 1991), co-edited The Legacy of logical positivism; studies in the philosophy of science with Peter Achinstein (Johns Hopkins Press, 1969),

References

Philosophers from Virginia
Philosophers from Ohio
Philosophers from Maryland
Philosophers of mathematics
Swarthmore College alumni
Harvard University alumni
University of Virginia faculty
Ohio State University faculty
Johns Hopkins University faculty
1927 births
2019 deaths
Philosophers from California